Telmatogeton is a genus of midges in the non-biting midge family (Chironomidae).

Species
T. abnormis (Terry, 1913)
T. alaskensis Coquillett, 1900
T. atlanticum Oliveira, 1950
T. australicus Womersley, 1936
T. fluviatilis Wirth, 1947
T. goughi Sæther & Andersen, 2011
T. hirtus Wirth, 1947
T. japonicus Tokunaga, 1933
T. latipennis Wirth, 1949
T. macswaini Wirth, 1949
T. minor Kieffer, 1914
T. murrayi Sæther, 2009
T. namum Oliveira, 1950
T. pacificus Tokunaga, 1935
T. pectinatus (Deby, 1889)  
T. pusillum Edwards, 1933
T. sanctipauli Schiner, 1866
T. torrenticola (Terry, 1913)
T. trilobatus (Kieffer, 1911)
T. trochanteratum Edwards, 1931
T. williamsi Wirth, 1947

References

Chironomidae